Solax Studios was an American motion-picture studio founded in 1910 by executives from the Gaumont Film Company of France. Alice Guy-Blaché, her husband Herbert, and a third partner, George A. Magie, established the Solax Company.

Guy-Blaché was artistic director and the director for many of the studio's films, while her husband Herbert managed production for the new company. They took over the studio Gaumont had built in Flushing, New York in 1908 for the production of Chronophone sound films, a venture which proved unsuccessful for Gaumont. Solax produced silent films in Flushing from October 1910 to the summer of 1912. Prospering, Solax invested more than $100,000 in a modern production plant in 1912 in Fort Lee, New Jersey, which had become the center of America's first motion picture industry.

This was a time when the American film industry was rapidly changing from little more than a scientific curiosity to an important sector of the economic engine driving the economy. In this environment, Solax was conceived as an all-in-one operation with its own film processing laboratory and state of the art stages built under a glass roof. In addition to administrative offices, production facilities included dressing rooms, a set-fabrication workshop, and a costume-design department with a sewing room.

In 1912, the studio made a short film titled A Fool and His Money, directed by Guy-Blaché. It is believed to be the first film ever made with an all-African-American cast. The film is now at the National Center for Film and Video Preservation at the American Film Institute.

Metro Pictures (now MGM) began its business life in 1916 primarily as a distributor of successful Solax films. Several emerging stars appeared in Solax films including Lionel and Ethel Barrymore, Claire Whitney, Olga Petrova, and Billy Quirk.

In between their own productions, the Blachés leased the studios to other production companies such as the Goldwyn Picture Corporation and Selznick International Pictures. However, Solax and the rest of the East Coast film industry rapidly declined throughout the 1920s as a result of the phenomenal growth of motion-picture facilities in Hollywood, California that offered lower costs and a climate that accommodated year-round filming.

Inadequate firefighting methods resulted in the destruction of Solax Film Laboratories in Fort Lee, New Jersey in 1919.

References

External links

 Alice Guy Blache Solax Film

American companies established in 1910
Entertainment companies established in 1910
Mass media companies established in 1910
Defunct American film studios
Mass media in New Jersey
1919 fires in the United States
Silent film studios
Fort Lee, New Jersey
Film production companies of the United States